NFCB may refer to:  

 National Federation of Community Broadcasters

 National Financial Credit Bank in Cameroon